A push-pull olefin is a type of olefin characterized by an electron-withdrawing substituent on one side of the double bond and an electron-donating substituent on the other side. This makes the pi bond very polarized. The rotational barrier for a push-pull olefin is lower than that of an ordinary olefin and this makes it an interesting candidate for a molecular switch for instance azobenzenes. A push-pull configuration also helps to stabilize the double bond because the carbon-carbon bond has considerably less double bond character. For instance cyclobutadiene is a very unstable molecule but with both olefinic bonds in push-pull configuration (two ester substituents and two tertiary amine substituents) the molecule is stable indeed.

References 
 Ethyl (2-cyano-3-ethoxyacryloyl)carbamate: irreversible thermal isomerization of a push-pull olefin Kuangsen Sung, Ming-Chi Lin, Pin-Mei Huang, Bo-Ren Zhuang, Robert Sung,Ru-Rong Wu Arkivoc 2005 p. 131  open access publication

See also
Leimgruber–Batcho indole synthesis
 Application of push–pull olefins in molecular logic gates

Alkene derivatives
Organic chemistry